The Wood Freeman House No. 1 is a historic house at 702 Arch Street in Searcy, Arkansas.  It is a -story T-shaped structure, with a wood frame and rusticated stone exterior.  Its main axis is horizontal to the street, with the cross section at the right.  The main entrance is at the crook of the T, set under a projecting gable section with round-arch opening.  Built about 1934, it is a fine local example of English Revival architecture. Wood Freeman House No. 2 is the other architecturally significant houses built by local builder Wood Freeman.

The house was listed on the National Register of Historic Places in 1991.

See also
National Register of Historic Places listings in White County, Arkansas

References

Houses on the National Register of Historic Places in Arkansas
Houses completed in 1934
Houses in Searcy, Arkansas
National Register of Historic Places in Searcy, Arkansas
1934 establishments in Arkansas
Tudor Revival architecture in Arkansas